Guðmundur Steinarsson (born 20 October 1979) is an Icelandic international former footballer who played as a striker. Steinarsson is currently assistant manager at Fjölnir. He spent the majority of his playing career with Keflavík, where he started his career in 1996, playing more than 250 league games for the club. Guðmundur has also had spells in Denmark and Switzerland with Brønshøj BK and FC Vaduz.

Career

Club career
Guðmundur began his career in 1996 with Keflavík, and went on to score 28 goals in 82 league matches over the following six years. During the 1999 season, he had a spell on loan at KA Akureyri. Guðmundur left Keflavík in July 2002 in order to move to Denmark to play with Brønshøj BK. He played 15 matches for the Danish club, and spent the 2003 campaign on loan in Iceland with Fram Reykjavik. After two years away, he rejoined Keflavík in 2004 and spent a further five seasons with the club, making a further 105 first-team appearances and scoring 45 goals. In the 2008 season, he was named Players' Player of the Year in the Icelandic league.

On 16 January 2009, Guðmundur signed for FC Vaduz and scored on his debut for the club in the 1–1 draw with FC Aarau. Over the following four months, he played 12 league games for Vaduz before leaving Liechtenstein in the summer of 2009. He subsequently rejoined his former club, Keflavík in July of that year and spent another four seasons with the Úrvalsdeild side, scoring 17 goals in 74 league matches. By the time he left Keflavík at the end of the 2012 campaign, he had become the club's all-time top appearance maker and goalscorer in top-division football with 81 goals in 255 matches. On 17 January 2013, it was announced that he had agreed to play for 2. deild karla outfit Njarðvík for the 2013 season.

International career
Guðmundur was capped three times playing for Iceland. He made his debut in a friendly match against Brazil on 8 March 2002, where Kaká scored his first international goal when Brazil won 6–1. Six years later, on 6 November 2008, Guðmundur played in Iceland's 2–2 draw against Norway in a 2010 FIFA World Cup qualifying match, before he played his last international match when Malta won 1–0 against Iceland in a friendly match two weeks later.

Honours

Individual
Topscorer Icelandic Premier League in 2008 with 16 Goals.
Keflavík Sports Club Sportsman of the Year in 2008.

References

External links

1979 births
Living people
Association football forwards
Gudmundur Steinarsson
Gudmundur Steinarsson
Gudmundur Steinarsson
Gudmundur Steinarsson
Brønshøj Boldklub players
FC Vaduz players
Expatriate men's footballers in Denmark
Expatriate footballers in Switzerland
Gudmundur Steinarsson
Expatriate footballers in Liechtenstein
Gudmundur Steinarsson
Gudmundur Steinarsson
Gudmundur Steinarsson
Icelandic expatriate sportspeople in Denmark
Icelandic expatriate sportspeople in Liechtenstein